Veit Kührt (born 3 December 1940) is a German former ski jumper. He competed in the individual event at the 1960 Winter Olympics.

References

External links
 

1940 births
Living people
German male ski jumpers
Olympic ski jumpers of the United Team of Germany
Ski jumpers at the 1960 Winter Olympics
People from Zella-Mehlis
Sportspeople from Thuringia
20th-century German people